was a Japanese politician who served as governor of Hiroshima Prefecture from July to December 1898. He was also governor of Iwate Prefecture (1891–1898), Nagasaki Prefecture (1898–1900) and Hyōgo Prefecture (1900–1916). He was the first president of the Seismological Society of Japan (1880–1882), as well as president of Kyoritsu Women's University (1886–1891). He was on the faculty of the University of Tokyo and Kyoto University.

Governors of Hiroshima
1851 births
1929 deaths
Japanese Home Ministry government officials
Governors of Iwate Prefecture
Governors of Nagasaki Prefecture
Governors of Hyōgo Prefecture
Academic staff of the University of Tokyo
Academic staff of Kyoto University